Bananal may refer to the following places and jurisdictions :

 Bananal, São Paulo, city in Brazil
 Bananal (micro-region), micro-region in Brazil
 Bananal Island, island in Araguaia River, Brazil
 the former Territorial Prelature of Bananal